Platypelis pollicaris, or common giant tree frog, is a species of frog in the family Microhylidae.
It is endemic to northern and eastern Madagascar.
Its natural habitats are subtropical or tropical moist lowland forests, subtropical or tropical moist montane forests, plantations, and heavily degraded former forest.
It is threatened by habitat loss.

Sources

References

p
Endemic frogs of Madagascar
Amphibians described in 1888
Taxa named by George Albert Boulenger
Taxonomy articles created by Polbot
Taxobox binomials not recognized by IUCN